Shiraz Uppal (born 29 January 1975) is a Pakistani singer, songwriter and music producer.

His popular songs are “Tu Kuja Man Kuja”, “Tera Te Mera”, "Raanjhanaa",“Mann Ja Ve”, “Roya Re”, Rabba", “Saiyan Ve”, "3 Bahadur" and many more. He did his MBA in 1998 and then pursued his passion for music.

Shiraz owns a state of the art audio studio in Lahore called S.U Studios where he composes, produces, records, mixes and masters all of his songs and those of the others. S.U. Studios is known for producing the cleanest and high-end sound in the music industry. He also produced the biggest hit of Coke Studio (season 8), Tajdar-e-Haram sung by Atif Aslam.

Shiraz Uppal also composed and produced 5 songs in Coke Studio Season 9. Also sang a song "Tu Hi Tu" with Mehwish Hayat and "Tu Kuja" with Rafaqat Ali Khan.

Shiraz has composed and given music into Atif Aslam’s song "Pehli Dafa".

Discography

Albums 
Tu Hai Meri (2001)
Tera Tay Mera (2003)
Jhuki Jhuki (2005)
Ankahi (2009)

Pakistani Film Songs

Bollywood Songs

Pakistani Drama Songs

Accolades

References

External links

1975 births
Living people
Pakistani male singers
Pakistani record producers
Punjabi people
Singers from Lahore